Mutebi Nnyonyintono Kiweewa was Kabaka of the Kingdom of Buganda from 2 August 1888 until 21 October 1888. He was the 32nd Kabaka of Buganda.

Claim to the throne

He was born at Nakatema prior to 1856, the eldest son of Kabaka Mukaabya Walugembe Mutesa I Kayiira, Kabaka of Buganda, who reigned between 1856 and 1884. His mother was Kiribakka of the Mamba clan. He ascended to the throne following the defeat of his younger brother, Kabaka Mwanga II by the combined Christian, Muslim and rebel Baganda forces. The defeat of Mwanga II occurred on 2 August 1888. Kiweewa was crowned on 11 September 1888. He maintained his capital at Mengo Hill.

Married life
He is recorded to have married twenty (20) wives:
 Lady Bukirwa Nassaza
 Lady Butema
 Lady Kajja
 Lady Lozaliya
 Lady Luleba, Omusenero
 Lady Namubiru
 Lady Balirwa
 Lady Namuli, Omufumbiro
 Naabakyaala Namusoke, Kaddulubaale
 Lady Nambajjwe
 Lady Nambi I
 Lady Nambi II
 Lady Nambi III
 Lady Tebalyayeebwa, Omulindamazzi
 Lady Teyansigira
 Lady Lwandeeta
 Naabakyaala Zandaba, the Namasole, previously the Kaddulubaale
 Naabakyaala Mbagumidde, the Kabejja
 Lady Bwangu
 Lady Sabaddu

Issue

He fathered 23 children, 21 sons and two daughters:

 Prince Kiweewa Ssimbwa, whose mother was Lady Butema
 Prince (Omulangira) Walulyo I, whose mother was Lady Butema
 Prince (Omulangira) Kibuuka, whose mother was Lady Kajja
 Prince (Omulangira) Nabadda, whose mother was Lady Lozaliya
 Prince (Omulangira) Muyinda, whose mother was Lady Luleba, Omusenero
 Prince (Omulangira) Agustin [Gusito] Tebandeke, whose mother was Lady Namubiru. He was educated at Namilyango College.
 Prince (Omulangira) Lulaba, whose mother was Lady Namuli
 Prince (Omulangira) Kagunya, whose mother was Lady Namuli
 Prince (Omulangira) Lukongwa, the Ssaabalangira (Chief Prince), whose mother was Lady Namusoke
 Prince (Omulangira) Kiwanuka, whose mother was Lady Namusoke
 Prince (Omulangira) Walulyo II, whose mother was Lady Namusoke
 Prince (Omulangira) Kalubagwiire, whose mother was Lady Nambajjwe
 Prince (Omulangira) Sekamaanya, whose mother was Lady Nambi I
 Prince (Omulangira) Namulinzi I, whose mother was Lady Nambi II
 Prince (Omulangira) Mwanga, whose mother was Lady Nambi III
 Prince (Omulangira) Chwa, whose mother was Tebalyayeebwa
 Prince (Omulangira) Ngenza, whose mother was Tebalyayeebwa
 Prince (Omulangira) Namulinzi II, whose mother was Teyansigira
 Prince (Omulangira) Namika, whose mother was Lady Lwandeeta
 Prince (Omulangira) Musisi, whose mother was Lwandeeta
 Prince (Omulangira) Nasuswa, whose mother was Lady Zandaba
 Princess (Omumbejja) Hana Mazzi, whose mother was Balirwa
 Princess (Omumbejja) Agaati Kagere, whose mother Tebalyayeebwa

His reign

Kabaka Kiweewa Nnyonyintono's rein is the shortest in the recorded history of Buganda. He was the Kabaka-in-waiting for around six weeks; after he was crowned, he lasted a mere forty days on the throne. His reign was characterized by conflict and rebellion among the members of the royal court and intrigue and plotting among the Arabic Muslim and European Christian forces that supported the warring factions.

Some of the great officers of state during his reign included;

Kiweewa's reforms included lifting the ban on Arab trade with Bunyoro, as well as reducing the payment his predecessors had imposed on export and import of merchandise. he undertook to repay the ivory debt Mwanga owed the Arab traders.
In a meeting he held with the European missionaries and the Muslims, Kiweewa promised to build a mosque for the Muslims. However, his announcement that none of his subjects should be interfered with on the grounds of his religion was not heeded, and the Muslim party upon gaining power pressed for his circumcision and conversion to their faith.

The final days
He was deposed by the Muslim forces of his brother Kabaka Kalema Muguluma, who reigned from 21 October 1888 until 5 October 1889. He was captured and thrown in jail. He was killed in prison by his Muslim captors in July 1889. He was buried at Masanafu, Kyaddondo.

Quotes
"Like Vitellius, eight hundred years before, he had never wished to rule, and like Vitellius also, when he saw that they were resolved to kill him, he appealled in vain to his slayers not to put to death the man once they had made a ruler over them." 
 Sir John M. Gray, "The Year of the Three Kings of Buganda", 1950

"Kiweewa himself was a tall, thin man with a very dark skin which was heavily poxed. He was fairly advanced in age, completely devoid of political ambition and without any quality of leadership. The only good thing about him was that he was kind-hearted but conservative."
 MSM Kiwanuka, "Kabaka Mwanga and his Political Parties", 1969

"When he ascended the throne Kiweewa was of the view that he would be the supreme authority in the land of just as his predecessors had been. But soon Kiweewa discovered that he was no more than a puppet in the hands of his officers and ministers."
 A. Mutyaba, The Muslim Factor in Uganda, 1840-1900

Succession table

See also
Kabaka of Buganda

References

External links
List of Kings of Buganda

Kabakas of Buganda
19th-century monarchs in Africa
19th-century births
1889 deaths